Philip H. Hamm (born 1859) was a former Republican member of the Wisconsin State Assembly.

Hamm was born on July 5, 1859, in Reeseville, Wisconsin, where he received his education. He moved to Milwaukee in 1886 and worked as a real estate and insurance agent. He served as a member of the Milwaukee common council for four years, was a trustee of the Milwaukee public library for two years, and was a deputy game warden for one year.

He was elected to the Wisconsin State Assembly in 1902, beating Henry Schuz (Democrat), Anton Palmo (Social Democrat), and Gustav Griebel (Independent).

Notes

1859 births
American people of German descent
Milwaukee Common Council members
Businesspeople from Wisconsin
People from Dodge County, Wisconsin
Year of death missing
Republican Party members of the Wisconsin State Assembly